The Loup River (pronounced /lup/) is a tributary of the Platte River, approximately  long, in central Nebraska in the United States. The river drains a sparsely populated rural agricultural area on the eastern edge of the Great Plains southeast of the Sandhills. The name of the river means "wolf" in French, named by early French trappers after the Skidi band of the Pawnee, whose name means "Wolf People," and who lived along its banks. The river and its tributaries, including the North Loup, Middle Loup, and South Loup, are known colloquially as "the Loups", comprising over 1800 mi (2900 km) of streams and draining approximately one-fifth of Nebraska.

Course
It flows east-northeast, past Fullerton, where it is joined from the north by the Cedar River. It continues east-northeast roughly parallel to the Platte, past Genoa, separated from the Platte by approximately 15 mi (24 km).

A diversion dam southwest of Genoa diverts water to the Loup Canal to hydroelectric facilities in Monroe and then in Columbus.  The canal then runs into the Platte a short distance below its confluence with the Loup.

Discharges

See also

List of Nebraska rivers
French colonization of the Americas
Mormon Trail

References

External links
Trail of the Loup (1906)

Rivers of Nebraska
Rivers of Platte County, Nebraska
Rivers of Nance County, Nebraska
Rivers of Merrick County, Nebraska
Rivers of Howard County, Nebraska
Rivers of Colfax County, Nebraska
Tributaries of the Platte River